Amanda Normann Refsgaard (born 8 March 2000) is a Danish ice hockey player and member of the Danish national ice hockey team, currently playing with the Rødovre Mighty Bulls Q of the KvindeLigaen.

Refsgaard represented Denmark at the IIHF Women's World Championship in 2021 and at the World Championship Division I Group A tournaments in 2017 and 2018. As a junior player with the Danish national under-18 team, she participated in the Division I Qualification tournament of the IIHF Women's U18 World Championship in 2015, the Division I tournament in 2016, and the Division I Group B tournaments in 2017 and 2018. While serving as an alternate captain at the 2018 IIHF U18 World Championship Division 1B, she recorded both the most assists (6) and most points (10) of any player in the tournament and the most goals (4) by a defenceman. The breakout performance was capped by her selection as Best Defenseman of the tournament by the directorate.

Career statistics

International

References

External links 
 

Living people
2000 births
People from Hørsholm Municipality
Danish women's ice hockey defencemen
Ice hockey players at the 2022 Winter Olympics
Olympic ice hockey players of Denmark
Sportspeople from the Capital Region of Denmark